Pilodeudorix corruscans, the Kakum diopetes, is a butterfly in the family Lycaenidae. It is found in Ivory Coast, Ghana, Cameroon, Gabon, the Central African Republic, the Democratic Republic of the Congo (from the north-eastern part of the country to Ituri and Lualaba) and Tanzania (the Kigoma District). The habitat consists of forests.

Subspecies
Pilodeudorix corruscans corruscans (Cameroon, Gabon, Central African Republic, Democratic Republic of the Congo: north-east to Ituri and Lualaba, Tanzania: Kigoma District)
Pilodeudorix corruscans kakumi (Larsen, 1994) (Ivory Coast, Ghana)

References

External links
Die Gross-Schmetterlinge der Erde 13: Die Afrikanischen Tagfalter. Plate XIII 66 b

Butterflies described in 1898
Deudorigini
Butterflies of Africa
Taxa named by Per Olof Christopher Aurivillius